Aleksandr Valeryevich Lazushin (born 9 April 1988) is a Russian professional ice hockey Goaltender who is currently playing with Admiral Vladivostok of the Kontinental Hockey League (KHL). He made his KHL debut in the 2010–11 season, appearing with Lokomotiv Yaroslavl and Metallurg Novokuznetsk.

On 2 August 2020, while still having a year to run on his contract with Lokomotiv, Lazushin left the team in order to return for a second stint with Kunlun Red Star.

References

External links 
 

1988 births
Admiral Vladivostok players
Dynamo Balashikha players
HC Dynamo Moscow players
HC Kunlun Red Star players
HC Lada Togliatti players
Living people
Lokomotiv Yaroslavl players
Metallurg Novokuznetsk players
Russian ice hockey goaltenders
Sportspeople from Yaroslavl
Yermak Angarsk players
Yuzhny Ural Orsk players
HC 07 Detva players
Russian expatriate sportspeople in China
Russian expatriate sportspeople in Latvia
Russian expatriate sportspeople in Slovakia
Russian expatriate ice hockey people
Expatriate ice hockey players in Slovakia
Expatriate ice hockey players in Latvia
Expatriate ice hockey players in China